25 is the debut extended play by South Korean singer Song Ji-eun, a member of South Korean girl group Secret. The EP was released on October 14, 2014 with the song "Pretty Age 25" serving as the lead track and "Don't Look At Me Like That" as a pre-release. The album contains five songs and was released in two versions.

Release
On September 23, Song Ji-eun released her first single "Don't Look At Me Like That", along with a music video. On October 13, the music video for her second single, "Pretty Age 25", was released. 25 was released on October 14. On December 2, Song Ji-eun released her first Japanese single, "Twenty-Five (Japanese Version)", from her first Japanese extended play, 25. On December 3, she released a Japanese version of "Don't Look At Me Like That".

Promotion
Song Ji-eun promoted the singles "Don't Look At Me Like That" and "Pretty Age 25" in September and October 2014 on KBS's Music Bank, MBC's Show! Music Core, SBS's Inkigayo and Mnet's M! Countdown. She also held a MelOn showcase on the day of her album release where she also performed her self-composed song "Star".

Track listing

Chart performance

Albums chart

Sales

Singles chart

Release history

Notes

References

External links
 Secret Official website

EPs by South Korean artists
K-pop EPs
Kakao M EPs
2014 EPs
TS Entertainment EPs